Faladié is a village and seat of the commune of N'Tjiba in the Cercle of Kati in the Koulikoro Region of south-western Mali. The village lies 77 km northwest of the Malian capital, Bamako.

References

Populated places in Koulikoro Region